Carex straminea, known as eastern straw sedge, is a species of sedge native to North America.

References

straminea
Flora of North America